La Plaine is a parliamentary electoral district in Dominica. It includes the areas of Boetica, Delices and La Plaine. It came into effect in time for the 1975 Dominican general election. It has been represented by Cassandra Williams of the Dominica Labour Party since the 2022 general election.

Constituency profile 
The constituency was established prior to the 1975 Dominican general election. There was an electorate of 2,562 . It includes the areas of Boetica, Delices and La Plaine. The boundary extends from Freshwater Lake, down the Taberi River to the sea, along the Point Mulâtre River to River Jack and from the source of the River Jack to  back to Freshwater Lake.

Representatives 
This constituency has elected the following members of the House of Assembly of Dominica:

Election results

Elections in the 2010s

References 

Constituencies of Dominica